Komochi-e (子持絵) or trick pictures are Japanese prints with movable printed paper flaps or other moveable parts.  Multicolor komochi-e may be called “komochi nishiki-e” (子持錦絵).

This komochi-e shows a single print with the flaps in different positions.  It is a scene from the kabuki play Manete Mimasu yotsuya no kikigaki (当三升四谷聞書).  The artist is Utagawa Kuniyoshi; the date is 1848; and it shows actor Ichikawa Danjūrō VIII in the role of the murderer Tamiya Iemon:

Footnotes

Ukiyo-e genres